Andros, also called Chora (Χώρα, "main town"), is a town and a former municipality on the island of Andros, in the Cyclades, Greece. Since the 2011 local government reform it is part of the municipality Andros, of which it is a municipal unit, and shares the island of Andros with the municipal units of Korthio and Ydrousa. The municipal unit has an area of 102.756 km2. Its population was 3,901 inhabitants at the 2011 census.

It has a mixture of post-World War I neoclassical mansions with vernacular Cycladic houses. The town squares are paved with marble. At the end of the headland are two islands. The first, linked to the mainland by a brick bridge, with a ruined Venetian castle and the second with a lighthouse. There are four museums: the extensive Archaeological Museum, Museum of Modern Art, a Nautical Museum and a Folklore Museum.

References

Populated places in Andros